General Browning may refer to:

Frederick Browning (1896–1965), British Army lieutenant general
George M. Browning Jr. (born 1928), U.S. Air Force lieutenant general
Ralph T. Browning (1941–2018), U.S. Air Force brigadier general

See also
Attorney General Browning (disambiguation)